This is a list of Turkish writers who are Ottoman or Turkish nationals and who write in Turkish language.

A 
 İhsan Oktay Anar, novelist, story writer (born 1960)
 Sait Faik Abasıyanık, short story writer, novelist, poet (1906–1954)
 Halide Edib Adıvar, novelist, scholar politician (1884–1964)
 Agah Efendi, journalist (1832–1885)
 Adalet Ağaoğlu, novelist and playwright (born 1929)
 Süreyya Ağaoğlu, lawyer (1903–1989)
 Zeynep Ahunbay, scholar (born 1946)
 Munejjim-bashi Ahmed Dede, courtier, poet, historian (died 1702)
 Ahmed Vefik Pasha, translator, playwright, statesman, dictionary writer, diplomat of Greek origin (1823–1891)
 Hikmet Temel Akarsu, novelist, short story writer, playwright, satirist (born 1960)
 Gülten Akın, poet (1933–2015)
 Alev Alatlı, economist, philosopher, novelist, columnist (born 1944)
 Sabahattin Ali, novelist, short story writer, poet, journalist (1903–1948)
 Melih Cevdet Anday, poet (1915–2002)
 Nezihe Araz, playwright, journalist, poet (1920–2009)
 Duygu Asena, journalist, women's rights activist (1946–2006)
 Nurullah Ataç, writer, poet and literary critic (1898–1957)
 Meltem Arıkan, novelist and playwright (born 1968)
 Yusuf Atılgan, novelist, short story writer and playwright (1921–1989)
 Doğan Avcıoğlu, journalist, politician (1926–1983)
 Şevket Süreyya Aydemir, historian, economist (1897–1976)
 Behçet Aysan, physician and poet (1949-1993)
 Samiha Ayverdi, Sufi mystic (1905–1993)

B 
 Vecihi Başarın,  historian (born 1947)
 Pelin Batu, actress, poet, historian (born 1978)
 Enis Batur, poet, essayist, novelist, editor (born 1952)
 Ataol Behramoğlu, poet, essayist, translator (born 1942)
 Nazan Bekiroğlu, novelist (born 1957)
 İlhan Berk, poet (1918–2008)
 Asım Bezirci, critic, writer and poet (1927-1993)
 Aydın Boysan, architect, scholar, essayist (born 1921)
 Rıza Tevfik Bölükbaşı, philosopher, poet, politician (1869–1949)
 Sevim Burak, playwright, poet (1931–1983)
 Coşkun Büktel, playwright, screenwriter, novelist, critic (born 1950)

C 
 Edip Cansever, poet (1928–1986)
 Abdullah Cevdet, poet, philosopher, translator (1869–1932)

Ç 
 Ece Ayhan Çağlar (1931–2002), poet
 Semih Çalışkan (born 1986), novelist

D 
 Fazıl Hüsnü Dağlarca, poet (1914–2008)
 Ahmet Muhip Dıranas, poet and playwright (1909–1980)
 Sulhi Dölek, satirist (1948–2005)

E 
 Erzurumlu Emrah (1775–1854), folk poet
 Ercüment Ekrem Talu (1886–1956), humorist, journalist
 Refik Erduran (1928–2017), playwright, journalist and writer
 Mehmet Akif Ersoy (1873–1936), poet, scholar, writer of the Turkish National Anthem

F 
 Fitnat Hanım (died in 1780), poet

G 
 Müjdat Gezen, theatre actor and writer (born 1943)
 Ziya Gökalp, sociologist, poet, political activist (1876–1924)
 Reşat Nuri Güntekin, novelist, storywriter and playwright (1889–1956) 
 Osman Necmi Gürmen, novelist
 Hüseyin Rahmi Gürpınar, writer and politician (1864–1944)

H 
 Kınalızâde Hasan Çelebi, poet and bibliographer (1546–1604)
 Ahmet Haşim, poet (1884–1933)
 Nazım Hikmet, poet, playwright, novelist, screenwriter, director (1902–1963)
 Abdülhak Şinasi Hisar, novelist and biographer (1887–1963)
 Oktay Rıfat Horozcu, poet and playwright (1914–1988)

I 
 Rıfat Ilgaz, teacher, writer and poet (1911–1993)

İ 
 Attilâ İlhan, poet, novelist, journalist, essayist, reviewer (1925–2005)

K 
 Orhan Veli Kanık, poet (1914–1950)
 Ceyhun Atuf Kansu, poet, author (1919–1978)
 Yakup Kadri Karaosmanoğlu, novelist, journalist, poet (1889–1974)
 Orhan Kemal, novelist (1914–1970)
 Yahya Kemal, poet, author, politician and diplomat (1884–1958)
 Yaşar Kemal, writer and human rights activist (1923–2015)
 Necip Fazıl Kısakürek, poet, novelist, playwright (1904–1983)
 Mehmet Fuat Köprülü, historian (1890–1966)
 Ayşe Kulin, novelist and columnist (born 1941)

M 
 Aşık Mahzuni Şerif, folk musician, ashik, poet, composer (1940–2002)
 Murathan Mungan, novelist, short story writer, poet, playwright (born 1955)
 Emre Miyasoğlu, essayist and dramatist (born 1981)

N 
 Aziz Nesin, novelist, humorist, playwright, poet, short story writer (1915–1995)
 Nedîm, poet (1681–1730)
 Nef'i, poet and satirist (1572–1635)
 Nergisî, prose writer (c. 1580–1635)

Ö 
 İsmet Özel, poet (born 1944)

P 
 Orhan Pamuk, novelist, screenwriter, scholar, Nobel laureate in Literature (born 1952)
 Pir Sultan Abdal, poet (c. 1480–1550)

S 
 Peyami Safa, journalist, columnist and novelist (1899–1961)

Ş 
 Elif Şafak, author, columnist, speaker and academic (born 1971)

T 
 Kemal Tahir, novelist and intellectual (1910–1973)
 Haldun Taner, playwright and short story writer (1915–1986)
 Ercüment Ekrem Talu, writer, humorist and a journalist (1886–1956)
 Ahmet Hamdi Tanpınar, poet, novelist, literary scholar and essayist (1901–1962)
 Fatma Aliye Topuz, novelist, columnist, essayist (1862–1936)

V
 Vedat Türkali, screenwriter, playwright, novelist (1919–2016)

Y 
 Yunus Emre, poet and mystic (1238–1320)
 Mehmet Emin Yurdakul, poet (1869–1944)

Z 
 Halide Nusret Zorlutuna, poet and novelist (1901–1984)

See also 
List of Turkish short story writers
List of Turkish women writers

References

External links
Türk Dili ve Edebiyatı Ansiklopedisi Dergâh Yayınevi
YKY Tanzimat'tan Bugüne Edebiyatçılar Ansiklopedisi

Turkish writers
Writers
Turkey